Alive is the first live album by Swedish extreme metal band Meshuggah. The film was released as a double album (DVD with CD in digipak) through Nuclear Blast on 5 February 2010 in Europe and 9 February 2010 in North America.

Half of the film consists of the band performing songs on their obZen Tour during 2008–2009. This is intertwined with documentary-style clips of the members talking about their experiences in the band. Also on the DVD is "The Making of Bleed", a documentary on how the music video for "Bleed" was shot, along with the music video itself; and a "Drum Tour" and "Guitar Tour".

The cover is made to imitate the film poster for Alien.

Track listing

DVD
 "Begin"
 "Perpetual Black Second"
 "Twenty Two Hours"
 "Pravus"
 "Dissemination"
 "Bleed"
 "Ritual"
 "New Millennium Cyanide Christ"
 "Cleanse"
 "Stengah"
 "The Mouth Licking What You've Bled"
 "Machine"
 "Electric Red"
 "Solidarius"
 "Rational Gaze"
 "Moment"
 "Lethargica"
 "Communicate"
 "Combustion"
 "Humiliative"
 "Infinitum"
 "Straws Pulled at Random"
 "End"

Bonus material
 "'Bleed' music video"
 "The Making of 'Bleed'"
 "Micha Guitar Tour"
 "Tomas Drum Tour"

Live audio CD

Personnel
Jens Kidman – vocals
 Fredrik Thordendal – lead guitar
 Mårten Hagström – rhythm guitar
 Tomas Haake – drums
 Dick Lövgren – bass
 Ian McFarland – direction, production
 Markus Staiger – executive production
 Chris O'Coin – assistant editing
 Joey Korenman – animation, design
 Daniel Bergstrand – mixing
 Nathan Bice – mixing

Charts

Album charts

DVD charts

References

Meshuggah albums
2010 video albums
Live video albums
2010 live albums
Nuclear Blast live albums
Nuclear Blast video albums
Concert films